The Vironians were one of the Finnic tribes that later formed the Estonian nation.

History
They lived in Vironia (Virumaa in Estonian, Wierland in German and Virland in Scandinavian, now Ida-Viru County and Lääne-Viru County of Estonia). Vironians were divided into five clans (kilikunda), Maum (in Estonian "Mahu"), Laemund  (Lemmu) also known as Pudiviru, Askele, Revele (Rebala), Alentagh (Alutaguse). They built many strongholds, like Tarwanpe (modern Rakvere) and Agelinde (now Punamägi Hill in Äntu village).

Like other Estonian tribes, Vironians remained predominantly pagan before Northern Crusades in the 13th century.  According to the Chronicle of Henry of Livonia, Vironians believed that Tharapita, a god worshipped by Osilians (the tribe inhabiting Saaremaa) was born in Vironia. However, Vironian elder Thabelin of Pudiviru had endorsed Christianity before the German and Danish crusaders reached Estonia. Thabelin (Tabellinus) was baptized by Germans in Gotland island. Later, when competing Danish crusaders arrived in Vironia, Thabelin was suspected of being too pro-German and was hanged.

In 1219, the German crusaders of the Livonian Brothers of the Sword made a raid against Vironians together with recently christened Letts, Livonians, and several proto-Estonian tribes (Sakalians, Ugaunians and Jervians). After five days of killing and pillaging, Kyriavan, Thabelin and other Vironian elders asked for a truce. According to the chronicle, Kyriavan told he had a "very bad god" before and therefore was ready to accept the Christian god. After truce was made, Vironian elders accepted Christianity. Some sons of elders from all five Vironian clans were taken hostages by the crusaders as part of the truce.

In 1221, Vironians took part in failed attempt to oust Danes who had built a fortress in the place of modern Tallinn in the neighboring province of Revelia. Danes retaliated, killed several Vironian elders and put Vironians under heavy taxes. In 1225, Danes and German crusaders clashed with each other over the ownership of Vironia. In 1226, The papal legate William of Modena arrived at the Vironian stronghold of Tarwanpe and mediated peace between the Germans, Danes, and Estonians.

A year later the Vironian territories were taken by Brothers of the Sword. Vironians sided with the new Papal Legate Baldwin of Alna who in 1230 tried to create a Papal Vassal State in Northern Estonia, including Vironia. In 1233, the supporters of Baldwin were defeated by the Order in the city of Reval (Tallinn). Vironian territories were snatched by the Order again as Baldwin of Alna complained in his report to the Pope in 1234. The Order was also accused of oppressing Vironian converts and expelling local supporters of Church.

In 1238, Vironia was given to Denmark again according to the treaty of Stensby. The area went into hands of powerful vassals of Danish king, many of which were of local origin, like Dietrich of Kievel (probably 'Kivela' - 'land of stone' in Estonian) who controlled Eastern part of Vironia, where he started to build the stronghold of Narva. Vironians and Vironian vassals took part in Order's and Denmark's failed crusade against Russia 1240-1242.

The names Virumaa, Vironia and Virland have been continuously used for the North-Eastern Estonia. For example, in 1266, Margrete Sambiria, Dowager Queen of Denmark was named the Lady of Estonia and Virland.

Etymology
The name Viru probably has Finnic roots (e.g., Finnish language vireä means "vivacious", "lively"). According to an alternative hypothesis the word Viru may have originated from Baltic languages with the meaning 'man' (cf. English word virile). Earliest mention of the name is probably on the Ängby Runestone located in Uppland, Sweden which has inscription in memory of a Viking named Björn who was killed in Virland (uirlant). In Finnish language, Estonia is still called Viro after Vironians. 'Viro' is also present in several Finnish place names like Virolahti, Virojoki and last names (Vironen, Virolainen).

In Estonian, the word virulased is used for inhabitants of modern Virumaa counties or speakers of North Eastern Estonian dialects.

Trivia
"A girl from Virland" (French: "Graüben, jeune Virlandaise") is character of Jules Verne's 'Journey to the Centre of the Earth'.

Australian author Henry Lawson has written poetry about mythical "Kingdom of Virland".

The name Vironia was also chosen for a popular Estonian academic fraternal corporation, which was established in 1900 in Riga, Latvia and currently has representation in Tartu, Tallinn, Toronto, the American East and West coasts and Australia.

See also
Virumaa
Danish Estonia
Northern Crusades

References

Baltic Finns
Livonian Crusade